The women's 50m breaststroke events at the 2017 World Para Swimming Championships were held in Mexico City 2–7 December 2017.

Medalists

Results

References

2017 World Para Swimming Championships